The 2011 Eurocup Clio season was the inaugural season of the Renault–supported touring car category, a one-make racing series that is part of the World Series by Renault, the series uses Renault Clio RS 197's. It replaced the French F4 Championship which ran for one season in 2010.

Frenchman Nicolas Milan won the first season with ease by taking five wins and appearing on the podium in second for the other 3 races, comfortably ahead of Dutchman Mike Verschuur by 72 points, who in turn was ahead of third place Massimiliano Pedalà by 51 points.

The series featured several different teams; however, there was no championship for teams.

Regulations

Sporting
 The points system for the first season were made to reflect the system used by the FIA for World championships. The top ten drivers in each race were awarded points as follows: 25, 18, 15, 12, 10, 8, 6, 4, 2, and 1.

Race calendar and results
The calendar for the 2011 season was announced on 11 October 2010, the day after the end of the 2010 season. All of the four rounds formed meetings of the 2011 World Series by Renault season.

Championship standings
 Points for both championships were awarded as follows:

Drivers' Championship

External links
Results
More results
Website

Eurocup Clio
Eurocup Clio season
Eurocup Clio